The Savannah Music Festival (SMF) is dedicated to presenting a world-class celebration of the musical arts by creating timeless and adventurous productions that stimulate arts education, foster economic growth, and unite artists and audiences in Savannah. It is the largest musical arts event in Georgia and one of the most distinctive cross-genre music festivals in the world, featuring more than 100 productions over the 17-day festival each spring.

As a 501(c)3 not-for-profit organization dedicated to inspiring and growing audiences of all ages through engagement with the musical arts, SMF advances its vision through an array of musical performances that include dance, film, and narrative programs. The festival operates year-round to produce youth concerts, lectures, in-school touring programs, an annual high school jazz band competition and festival, as well as a weekly radio series, recordings, and other online and digital initiatives. SMF stages original, one-time only productions, premieres and double-bills, including many commissioned works. SMF has made collaboration a priority and works with organizations including the Savannah College of Art & Design (SCAD), Ships of the Sea Maritime Museum, Telfair Museums, Savannah Tour of Homes & Gardens, Lucas Theatre for the Arts, Historic Savannah Foundation/Davenport House Museum, The Creative Coast, Georgia Historical Society, Savannah Stopover Festival, and a variety of the City's houses of worship including Temple Mickve Israel, Christ Church Episcopal, the Cathedral of St. John the Baptist and Trinity United Methodist Church, all of which have helped to draw record numbers of tourists and local alike with each consecutive year from 2003 to 2019.

History 
In 1989, the Savannah OnStage International Arts Festival was founded by a group of community leaders, fostered by the Savannah Chamber of Commerce, and selected Elizabeth Stewart and Stewart Gordon as its top administrators. Until 2002, the weeklong, multi-disciplinary arts festival brought a variety of performers to Savannah each year during a 10-day festival, which included the acclaimed weeklong American Traditions Competition (ATC). In contrast to many vocal competitions that focused on repertoire of European origin, the ATC was dedicated to establishing the value and range of styles represented by composers of 19th and 20th century American art songs and popular music. Under the passionate leadership of Executive Director Elizabeth Stewart, Savannah OnStage continued to grow and it became a favorite event in the city's early springtime calendar. 

In 2002, the board of directors hired Rob Gibson as Executive and Artistic Director and the organization's name was changed to Savannah Music Festival (SMF). Gibson enlisted the talents of Associate Artistic Directors Daniel Hope and Marcus Roberts in 2003. He had seen Hope perform with the Beaux Arts Trio in NYC, and after a few conversations about Hope's own musical vision and varied artistic endeavors as a protege of Yehudi Menuhin, he was a natural fit for SMF programming. Gibson had worked with Roberts since 1989, and Roberts' virtuosity alongside his commitment to jazz education made him the perfect choice to spearhead SMF's high school jazz band workshop and competition, Swing Central Jazz. Like Hope, Roberts has premiered many new works at SMF and performed with a wide variety of musicians, including his trio's work with Béla Fleck at SMF (2011) and a concerto for piano trio and orchestra that he performed with the Atlanta Symphony Orchestra on April 6, 2013 (co-commissioned by ASO and SMF). 

With an annual operating budget of $3.4 million, the Savannah Music Festival is Georgia's largest musical arts event and one of the most distinctive cross-genre music festivals in the world. With a 17-day springtime festival as its centerpiece, it also presents year-round music education programs for Chatham and the six surrounding counties, produces a weekly public radio program featuring live SMF concert recordings, regularly commissions new work, and hosts two national mentorship programs for young musicians—one focused on the jazz orchestra and the other on American acoustic music—pairing some of the finest up and coming players with masters of each idiom. 

In 2014, SMF celebrated its 25th anniversary season. The non-profit performing arts organization has produced record ticket sales every year since 2003, continuously helping to create a growing cultural tourism boom, garner international acclaim, and connect artist and audiences in one of the South's most alluring cities.

The COVID-19 pandemic in 2020 caused the cancellation of the 32nd SMF and was deferred to 2021.

Music Education

Since 2003, the Savannah Music Festival has grown a music education program that is unlike that of any arts organization in the region. SMF's music education program is made up of Music For Our Schools, Swing Central Jazz, and the Acoustic Music Seminar. It is rooted in the belief that the arts are fundamental to the cognitive, affective, physical and intellectual development of all children. These programs reach more than 12,000 children each year throughout Savannah and the surrounding six counties.

External links 
Savannah music festival official website

Music festivals in Georgia (U.S. state)
Tourist attractions in Savannah, Georgia